Renpet was, in the Egyptian language, the word for "year". Its hieroglyph was figuratively depicted in art as a woman wearing a palm shoot (symbolizing time) over her head. She was often referred to as the Mistress of Eternity and also personified fertility, youth and spring. The glyph regularly appears on monuments and documents throughout Egyptian history as the beginning of the phrase recording the regnal year of the pharaoh.

See also
 Heh (god)
 Renpetneferet

References

Egyptian hieroglyphs
Egyptian hieroglyphs: trees and plants
Fertility goddesses
Egyptian goddesses